At least three ships of the Imperial Russian Navy have been named Tsesarevich after 
the Tsesarevich, the title of the male heir apparent.

  – 44-gun  that served with the Baltic Fleet; participated in the Crimean War and was hulked in 1858.
  – 135-gun steam-powered ship of the line that served with the Baltic Fleet; stricken in 1871.
  – pre-dreadnought battleship that participated in the Russo-Japanese War and World War I before she was scrapped in 1923–24.

Russian Navy ship names